On a Night Like This was the sixth concert tour by Australian recording artist Kylie Minogue, in support of her seventh studio album, Light Years (2000). The tour began on 3 March 2001 at the Clyde Auditorium in Glasgow, Scotland, and concluded on 15 May 2001 at the Sydney Entertainment Centre in Sydney, Australia, with both the Europe and Australia legs consisting of 23 shows each and by the time, making her the most successful touring female in Australia.

After the success of Minogue's performances at the closing ceremonies of 2000 Sydney Olympics and in the opening ceremony of the Paralympics days after, details of the tour were announced. Tickets went on sale in November of the same year, establishing her as one of the most in-demand live entertainers at the time. However, the tour began problematically, when the opening night at the RDS Arena in Dublin, Ireland on 1 March 2001, was cancelled due to air traffic control restrictions.

Background
Minogue was inspired by the style of Broadway shows such as 42nd Street and films such as Anchors Aweigh, South Pacific and the Fred Astaire and Ginger Rogers musicals of the 1930s. Describing Bette Midler as a "heroine", she also incorporated some of the "camp and burlesque" elements of Midler's live performances. The show directed and choreographed by Luca Tommassini featured elaborate back-drops such as the deck of an ocean liner, an Art Deco New York City skyline, and the interior of a space ship. Minogue was praised for her new material and her reinterpretations of some of her greatest successes, turning "I Should Be So Lucky" into a torch song and "Better the Devil You Know" into a 1940s big band number.

Opening act
 Chakradiva (Australia)
 Dimestars  (UK and Ireland)

Setlist

Act I
 "Loveboat"
 "Koocachoo"
 "Hand on Your Heart"
 "Put Yourself in My Place"

Act II
 "On a Night Like This"
 "Step Back in Time" / "Never Too Late" / "Wouldn't Change a Thing" / "Turn It into Love" / "Celebration"
 "Can't Get You Out of My Head"
 "Your Disco Needs You"

Act III
 "I Should Be So Lucky"
 "Better the Devil You Know"
 "So Now Goodbye"

Act IV
 "Physical"

Act V
 "Butterfly"
 "Confide in Me" / "Did It Again"
 "Kids"
 "Shocked"

Act VI
 "Light Years"
 "What Do I Have to Do"

Encore
 "Spinning Around"

Tour dates

Cancelled shows

Broadcasts and recordings 

Minogue's performance in Sydney, Australia, on 11 May 2001 was filmed for DVD entitled, Live in Sydney. The DVD was released on 1 October 2001 in the UK and 15 October 2001 in Australia.

The DVD features exclusive backstage footage of the concert, including a look into the dancers' dressing rooms and a prank played on Kylie during the show entitled 'Will Kylie Crack'. The prank consists of stage personnel doing random things below the stage where Kylie can see them when she turns to look at the backdrop during "So Now Goodbye".

Personnel
 Darenote Ltd., Kimberly Ltd. – producers
 Tarcoola Touring Company Ltd – producers
 Kylie Minogue – showgirl
 Terry Blamey – management
 William Baker – creative direction, styling
 Luca Tommassini – director of choreography
 Germana Bonaparte – assistant choreographer
 Sean Fitzpatrick – tour manager
 Steve Martin – production manager
 Andrew Small – musical director
 Steve Anderson – music producer
 Tanya Slater – tour coordinator
 Leanne Woolrich – assistant
 Julien Macdonald – wardrobe
 Pamela Blundell – wardrobe
 Manolo Blahnik – shoes

Musicians
 Andrew Small – drums
 James Mack – percussion
 Steve Turner – keyboards
 James Hayto – guitar
 Chris Brown – bass
Lurine Cato – backing vocals
 Sherina White – backing vocals

Dancers
 Milena Mancini – dancer
 Federica Catalano – dancer
 Veronica Peparini – dancer
 Tony Bongiorno – dancer
 Paolo Sabatini – dancer
 Gianluca Frezzato – dancer
 Christian Scionte – dancer
 Germana Bonaparte – dancer

External links
 "2001 On A Night Like This Tour"
 Kylie Minogue notable Tours-Part 3-On A Night Like This Tour - Kylie Live In Sydney
 On A Night Like This Tour 2001
 ON A NIGHT LIKE THIS 2001
 On A Night Like This Tour 2001
 DVD.net: Kylie-Live in Sydney

References

Kylie Minogue concert tours
2001 concert tours